Chamaecytisus purpureus (syn. Cytisus purpureus), the purple broom, is a species of flowering plant in the family Fabaceae. It is native to the southern and southeastern Alps and the Dinaric Alps down to northern Albania, and it has been introduced to various locales in Europe and the Caucasus. It is available from commercial suppliers.

References

Genisteae
Garden plants of Europe
Flora of Italy
Flora of Austria
Flora of Yugoslavia
Flora of Albania
Plants described in 1831